The 2008 Intense Football League season was the fourth and final season of the Intense Football League.  The regular season began on Saturday, March 1, 2008 and ended on Saturday, June 28.  The league champions were the Louisiana Swashbucklers, who defended their title by defeating the Corpus Christi Hammerheads in Intense Bowl IV on July 28, 2008.

Following Intense Bowl IV, the IFL champion, the Louisiana Swashbucklers, played against the UIF champion, the Sioux Falls Storm, on Saturday, August 2 in the inaugural National Indoor Bowl.

Standings

 Green indicates clinched playoff berth
 Grey indicates best league record

Playoffs

External links
 2008 stats

Intense Football League
Intense Football League seasons